The Big Unit may refer to:

 Randy Johnson, American Major League Baseball pitcher
 Quinten Lynch, Australian football full forward
 The Big Unit (album), by Lil' Keke and Slim Thug (2003)